Martín Ivan Bravo (born September 19, 1986 in Santa Fe) is a former Argentine-born and naturalized Mexican football striker, who last played for Tlaxcala.

After a slow start to his career with his home town club Colón de Santa Fe In 2007, he joined San Martín de San Juan on loan where he established himself as a first team player and a regular goalscorer during the opening stages of the Clausura 2008 tournament. He finished the season as one of the topscoring players with 9 goals in 19 games. In late 2008 Bravo had problems in his transfer to Pumas UNAM. His first game was vs. Chivas (a Pumas bitter rival). Bravo got injured in the game and ended his playing season. The game ended in a tie. In Clausura 2009 he became champions with Pumas eliminating Tecos, Puebla, and beat Pachuca to be champions. He holds Mexican citizenship.
On 2 June 2014 he joined León in a trade for former León striker Matias Britos who moved to Pumas UNAM for the Apertura 2014.

Career

Santos Laguna
On 29 November 2015, Club Santos Laguna announced that Bravo would be joining the squad for the Clausura 2016 on loan from Dorados de Sinaloa.

Honours
 Mexican Primera División: (2)
Pumas UNAM
  Clausura 2009
  Clausura 2011

References

External links
 
 
 Martín Bravo at Football-Lineups
 Martín Bravo – Argentina Primera statistics at Fútbol XXI 
 Profile at Goal.com 
 

1986 births
Living people
Argentine footballers
Argentine expatriate footballers
Association football forwards
Naturalized citizens of Mexico
Footballers from Santa Fe, Argentina
Club Atlético Colón footballers
San Martín de San Juan footballers
Club Universidad Nacional footballers
Club León footballers
Dorados de Sinaloa footballers
Santos Laguna footballers
C.D. Veracruz footballers
Central Norte players
Liga MX players
Argentine Primera División players
Argentine expatriate sportspeople in Mexico
Expatriate footballers in Mexico